The 1893 Yale Bulldogs baseball team represented Yale University in the 1893 college baseball season.  The Bulldogs competed as an Independent, with a student manager.

The Bulldogs advanced to the first national championship event for college baseball, held at the Chicago World's Fair and pitting top teams from the East, South, and West.  Yale won the tournament, defeating  in the final game 9–0.

Roster

Schedule

! colspan=2 style="" | Regular Season
|-

|- bgcolor=FFDDDD
| March 30 || at  || Franklin Field • Philadelphia, PA || L 6-11 || 0–1
|- bgcolor=DDFFDD
| March 31 || at Washington YMCA || Washington, DC || W 13-8 || 1–1
|-

|- bgcolor=DDFFDD
| April 1 || vs Virginia || Richmond, VA || W 14–8 || 2–1
|- bgcolor=DDFFDD
| April 3 || at Virginia || Charlottesville, VA || W 11–4 || 3–1
|- bgcolor=FFFFE6
| April 4 || at  || Baltimore, MD || T 7–7 || 3–1–1
|- bgcolor=DDFFDD
| April 5 || at Penn || Franklin Field • Philadelphia, PA || W 8–7 || 4–1–1
|- bgcolor=FFDDDD
| April 10 ||  || New Haven, CT || L 5–88 || 4–2–1
|- bgcolor=DDFFDD
| April 14 ||  || New Haven, CT || W 7–07 || 5–2–1
|- bgcolor=FFDDDD
| April 17 || at New York League || New York, NY || L 4–10 || 5–3–1
|- bgcolor=FFDDDD
| April 19 || at New York A.C. || New York, NY || L 4–6 || 5–4–1
|- bgcolor=FFDDDD
| April 22 || at Brooklyn || Brooklyn, NY || L 6–13 || 5–5–1
|- bgcolor=FFDDDD
| April 26 || at  || New York, NY || L 0–9 || 5–6–1
|- bgcolor=DDFFDD
| April 29 || at  || Williamstown, MA || W 10–0 || 6–6–1
|-

|- bgcolor=DDFFDD
| May 2 ||  || New Haven, CT || W 7–0 || 7–6–1
|- bgcolor=DDFFDD
| May 6 || Penn || New Haven, CT || W 5–4 || 8–6–1
|- bgcolor=FFDDDD
| May 8 || at  || Middletown, CT || L 2–4 || 8–7–1
|- bgcolor=FFDDDD
| May 10 || at Brown || Providence, RI || L 0–211 || 8–8–1
|- bgcolor=DDFFDD
| May 13 || at Orange (N.J.) A.C. || Orange, NJ || W 13–6 || 9–8–1
|- bgcolor=DDFFDD
| May 15 ||  || New Haven, CT || W 6–3 || 10–8–1
|- bgcolor=DDFFDD
| May 20 ||  || New Haven, CT || W 5–1 || 11–8–1
|- bgcolor=DDFFDD
| May 24 || Wesleyan || New Haven, CT || W 3–2 || 12–8–1
|- bgcolor=DDFFDD
| May 30 || Orange (N.J.) A.C. || New Haven, CT || W 16–9 || 13–8–1
|- bgcolor=DDFFDD
| May 31 || at Phillips Academy || Andover, MA || W 2–0 || 14–8–1
|-

|- bgcolor=FFDDDD
| June 3 || at Amherst || Amherst, MA || L 1–5 || 14–9–1
|- bgcolor=DDFFDD
| June 7 || Phillips Academy || New Haven, CT || W 6–2 || 15–9–1
|- bgcolor=DDFFDD
| June 10 || at Princeton || Princeton, NJ || W 2–0 || 16–9–1
|- bgcolor=FFDDDD
| June 13 ||  || New Haven, CT || L 3–4 || 16–10–1
|- bgcolor=DDFFDD
| June 17 || vs Princeton || New York, NY || W 14–7 || 17–10–1
|- bgcolor=FFDDDD
| June 24 || at  || Holmes Field • Cambridge, MA || L 2–310 || 17–11–1
|- bgcolor=DDFFDD
| June 27 || Harvard || New Haven, CT || W 3–0 || 18–11–1
|- bgcolor=FFDDDD
| July 1 || vs Harvard || New York, NY || L 4–6 || 18–12–1
|-

|-
! colspan=2 style="" | Post-Season
|-

|-
|

References

Yale
Yale Bulldogs baseball seasons
Yale Bull